This is the progression of world record improvements of the 3000 metres W65 division of Masters athletics.  Records must be set in properly conducted, official competitions under the standing IAAF rules unless modified by World Masters Athletics.  

The W65 division consists of female athletes who have reached the age of 65 but have not yet reached the age of 70, so exactly from their 65th birthday to the day before their 70th birthday.
Key

References

Masters Athletics 3000 m list

Masters athletics world record progressions